= Shan (restaurant) =

Restaurant in Bozeman, Montana, U.S.

- Interactive map of Shan

Restaurant information
- Food type: Chinese; Thai
- Location: 109 East Oak Street, Bozeman, Montana, 59715, United States
- Coordinates: 45°41′36″N 111°02′05″W

Shan is a restaurant in Bozeman, Montana, United States. It serves Chinese and Thai cuisine, and was a finalist in the Best New Restaurant category of the James Beard Foundation Awards in 2024.
